Stink Fisher (born William Fisher; July 30, 1970) is an American actor and restaurant owner who lives in Collingswood, New Jersey.

Born and raised Jewish in Cherry Hill, New Jersey, Fisher played high school football at Cherry Hill High School East. He played college football for the University of Minnesota Golden Gophers and at Rowan University.

Fisher used to own The Pop Shop, a 1950s-themed restaurant with locations in Collingswood and Medford.

He has been in movies such as Invincible, The Longest Yard, and most recently appeared as Ruth's father in The Lovely Bones and as Muscle Guy in Going the Distance. Fisher has appeared on The Sopranos, Late Night with Conan O'Brien, and Throwdown with Bobby Flay.  He appeared in the Body of Proof episode "Missing" in 2011, and in the Blue Bloods episode "Growing Boys" in 2013.  In 2015, Fisher played Aaron Helzinger in the "Knock Knock" episode as well as the "Damned If You Do" episode of Gotham season 2.   In 2016 he joined the cast of "Crossbreed" directed by Brandon Slagle which co-starred Vivica A. Fox as the first African-American female President in a feature film.

As a free agent, he was signed in 1993 with the New York Jets in the NFL before being cut and later played for the Montreal Allouettes of the Canadian Football League.

Filmography

References

External links

1970 births
Male actors from New Jersey
American male film actors
American male television actors
Jewish American male actors
Living people
Cherry Hill High School East alumni
People from Cherry Hill, New Jersey
People from Collingswood, New Jersey
American restaurateurs
Rowan Profs football players
Minnesota Golden Gophers football players
Players of American football from New Jersey
Sportspeople from Camden County, New Jersey
21st-century American Jews